Sharon Kane is a former American bondage model and pornographic actress. She has appeared in many adult magazines and pornographic films, in both dominant and submissive roles.

After leaving her home state of Ohio to move to San Francisco, she began working at porn director Alex De Renzy's theater before making her feature film debut in his film Pretty Peaches.

She is a member of both the AVN and XRCO Halls of Fame.

Recently, Kane works behind the camera as a director, production manager, art director and film composer. She wrote the scores for 1997's The Hills Have Bi's and Chi Chi La Rue's Idol in the Sky. She directed and starred in Stairway to Paradise, the movie featured in the book Coming Attractions: The Making of an X-Rated Movie.  After retiring as a performer, for a time she worked as a production assistant for Naughty America's gay site Suite 703.

Awards
AVN
 Hall of Fame Inductee
 1990 Best Actress – Video for Bodies in Heat – The Sequel
 1990 Best Couples Sex Scene – Film for Firestorm 3

GayVN
 2010 Trailblazer Award

XRCO
 Hall of Fame Inductee
 1984 Best Supporting Actress for Throat: 12 Years After
 1989 Best Actress for Bodies in Heat – The Sequel

References

External links
 
 
 

20th-century American actresses
American female adult models
American pornographic film actresses
Bondage models
Living people
Pornographic film actors from Ohio
Year of birth missing (living people)
21st-century American women